Best Thang Smokin' is the debut studio album by American rapper Young Dro. It was released on August 29, 2006, by Grand Hustle Records and Atlantic Records. Best Thang Smokin''' serves as Dro's major label debut, following his independent album, I Got That Dro'' (2001).

The album's production was handled by several high-profile record producers, such as Jazze Pha, Nitti and Develop, as well as Grand Hustle in-house producers Lil' C, Khao and Keith Mack. The Atlantic debut also features guest appearances from Slim Thug, T.I. and Xtaci. The album was supported by two singles, "Shoulder Lean" and "Rubberband Banks", the former of which went on to become a hit single.

Track listing

Chart positions

Weekly charts

Year-end charts

References

Young Dro albums
2006 albums
Albums produced by DJ Toomp
Albums produced by Jazze Pha
Grand Hustle Records albums
Albums produced by Lil' C (record producer)